Collberg is a Swedish surname. Notable people with the surname include:

Andrew Collberg (born 1987), Swedish musician
Sebastian Collberg (born 1994), Swedish ice hockey player

See also
Colberg

Swedish-language surnames